The Angola basketball cup is the second most important nationwide annual basketball competition in Angola.

In the preliminary stage, six teams contested in a 2-leg head-to-head playoff with the winners joining the remaining five "higher-ranked" teams for the quarter finals, at which stage, the eight teams will compete in a two-leg knock out play-off, followed by a two-leg semifinal. The final will be played in a single match.

2017 Angola Men's Basketball Cup

Preliminary rounds

Final round

Final

2017 Angola Women's Basketball Cup

See also
 2017 Angola Basketball Super Cup
 2016 BIC Basket
 2017 Victorino Cunha Cup

References

Angola Basketball Cup seasons
Cup